Tavaris Jermell "T. J." Slaughter (born February 20, 1977) is a former American football linebacker. He was drafted by the Jacksonville Jaguars in the third round of the 2000 NFL Draft. He played college football at Southern Mississippi.

Slaughter has also been a member of the Green Bay Packers, Baltimore Ravens, New Orleans Saints, San Francisco 49ers and New England Patriots.

External links
Official Web site
Green Bay Packers bio
New England Patriots bio

1977 births
Living people
Players of American football from Birmingham, Alabama
American football linebackers
Southern Miss Golden Eagles football players
Jacksonville Jaguars players
Green Bay Packers players
Baltimore Ravens players
New Orleans Saints players
San Francisco 49ers players
New England Patriots players